The MG P-type is a sports car that was produced by MG from 1934 to 1936. This 2-door sports car used an updated version of the Wolseley Motors-designed and made overhead camshaft, crossflow engine, used in the 1928 Morris Minor and previously fitted in the J-type Midget of 1932 to 1934, driving the rear wheels through a four-speed non-synchromesh gearbox. The chassis was a strengthened and slightly longer version of that used in the J-type with suspension by half-elliptic springs all round with rigid front and rear axles. Steering was initially by a Marles Weller and later a Bishop Cam system. Most cars were open two-seaters, but streamlined Airline coupé bodies were also made. The P-type was also available as a four-seater, a car that suffered from a lack of power and poor rear ground clearance. Whereas J, K and L-type MGs differentiated between versions with the use of numbers, with 1 indicating a four-seater (i.e., J1) and 2 a two-seater (i.e., J2), this was not the case with the P-type (or its six-cylinder sister, the N-type Magnette), and there is no clue to the type in the name.

MG PA
The first PA used an  engine similar to the J-Type's, now with a 3-bearing crankshaft, improved camshaft, and twin OM-model SU carburettors. In 1935, a two-seater roadster cost £222. 1,973 PAs were made, 27 of which were eventually converted to PBs.

MG PB

Externally the versions are very similar, the main difference being the radiator grille, where the PA has a honeycomb and the PB has vertical slats. The other obvious difference is in the design and material of the standard dashboard.

526 examples of the PB were produced. 

In 1936 a supercharged MG PB driven by Andrew Hutchinson won the Limerick Grand Prix.

References
 MG Sportscars. Malcolm Green. CLB International. 1997 
 A-Z of Cars of the 1930s. Michael Sedgwick and Mark Gillies. Bay View Books. 1989.

External links 

  MG Car Club Triple-M Register
Video (1936 International Grand Prix)

P
Cars introduced in 1934
1930s cars
24 Hours of Le Mans race cars
Coupés
Roadsters
Rear-wheel-drive vehicles